Rancho Mesa Verde is a census-designated place in Yuma County, in the U.S. state of Arizona. The population was 625 at the 2010 census.

Geography

Demographics

References

Census-designated places in Yuma County, Arizona